This is a list of Argentine literary figures, including poets, novelists, children's writers, essayists, and scholars.

A

Diego Abad de Santillán (1897–1983)
Marcos Aguinis (born 1935)
César Aira (born 1949)
Andrés J. d'Alessio (1940–2009)
Marcelina Almeida (ca. 1830-1880)
Juan Álvarez (1878–1954)
Mario Amadeo (1911–1983)
Federico Andahazi (born 1963)
Eduardo Angeloz (1931-2017)
José Arce (1881–1968)
Juan Argerich (1862–1924)
Roberto Arlt (1900–1942)
Hilario Ascasubi (1807–1875)
Carlos Astrada (1894–1970)

B
Odile Baron Supervielle (1915-2016)
Eduardo Belgrano Rawson (born 1943)
Eduardo Berti (born 1964)
Héctor Bianciotti (1930–2012)
Adolfo Bioy Casares (1914–1999)
Poldy Bird  (1941-2018)
Marcelo Birmajer  (born 1966)
Isidoro Blaisten (1933–2004)
Elsa Bornemann (1952–2013)
Jorge Luis Borges (1899–1986)
Miguel Brascó (1926–2014)
Edgar Brau (born 1958)
Esteban Lucas Bridges (1874–1949)
Delfina Bunge (1881–1952)

C
Facundo Cabral (1937–2011)
Susana Calandrelli (1901–1978)
Pilar Calveiro (born 1953)
Eugenio Cambaceres (1834–1880)
Estanislao del Campo (1834–1880)
José María del Campo (1826–1884)
Martín Caparrós (born 1957)
Ramón J. Cárcano (1860–1946)
Andrés Manuel Carretero (1927-2004)
Evaristo Carriego (1883–1912)
Leonardo Castellani (1889–1981)
Abelardo Castillo (1935-2017)
Nelson Castro (born 1955)
Haroldo Conti (born 1925, disappeared 1976)
Copi (1939–1987)
Julio Cortázar (1914–1984)
Roberto Cossa (born 1934)
Agustín Cuzzani (1924–1987)

D
Emma de Cartosio (1928–2013)
Marco Denevi (1922–1998)
Antonio Di Benedetto (1922–1986)
Adelia Di Carlo (1883-1965), Argentine writer, chronicler, founder
Osvaldo Dragún (1929–1999)
Alicia Dujovne Ortiz (born 1940)
León Dujovne (1898-1984)

E
Esteban Echeverría (1805–1851)
José Ricardo Eliaschev (1945–2014)

F
Sara Facio (born 1932)
María Inés Falconi (born 1954)
José Pablo Feinmann (1943–2021)
Macedonio Fernández (1874–1952)
Juan Filloy (1894–2000)
Fogwill (1941–2010)
Roberto Fontanarrosa (1944–2007)
Juan Forn (1959–2021)
Rodrigo Fresán (born 1963)
Rogelio Julio Frigerio (1914–2006)

G
Manuel Gálvez (1882–1962)
Griselda Gambaro (born 1928)
Juan Gelman (1930–2014)
Jordán Bruno Genta (1909–1974)
Alberto Gerchunoff (1883–1949)
Oliverio Girondo (1891–1967)
Betina Gonzalez (born 1972)
Clotilde González de Fernández (1880-1935)
Angélica Gorodischer (1928–2022)
Juana Manuela Gorriti (1818–1892)
Andrew Graham-Yooll (1944-2019)
Alberto Granado (1922–2011)
Paul Groussac (1848–1929)
Eduardo Gudiño Kieffer (1935–2002)
Che Guevara (1928–1967)
Ricardo Güiraldes (1886–1927)
Eduardo Gutiérrez (1851–1889)
Juan María Gutiérrez (1809–1878)

H
José Ignacio García Hamilton (1943–2009)
Iosi Havilio (born 1974)
Liliana Heker (born 1943)
José Rafael Hernández y Pueyrredón (1834–1886)
José Hernández (1834–1886)
Miguel Hesayne (1922–2019)
Eduardo Ladislao Holmberg (1852–1937)
Guillermo Enrique Hudson (1841–1922)

I

Carlos Ibarguren (1877–1956)
José Ingenieros (1877–1925)
Sylvia Iparraguirre (born 1947)
Julio Irazusta (1899–1982)

J
Arturo Jauretche (1901–1974)
Noé Jitrik (born 1928)

K
José Kessel (or Joseph Kessel) (1898-1979)
Alicia Kozameh (born 1953)

L
María Hortensia Lacau (1910-2006), Argentine pedagogue, writer, essayist, poet, educator
Leónidas Lamborghini (1927–2009)
Osvaldo Lamborghini (1940–1985)
Jorge Lanata (born 1960)
Héctor Libertella (1945–2006)
Gloria Lisé (born 1961)
Leopoldo Lugones (1874–1938)
Benito Lynch (1885–1951)

M
Tomás Maldonado (1922-2018)
Eduardo Mallea (1903–1982)
Francis Mallmann (born 1956)
Leopoldo Marechal (1900–1970)
José Mármol (1818–1871)
Guillermo Martínez (born 1962)
Tomás Eloy Martínez (1934–2010)
Eduardo Montes-Bradley (born 1960)
Ezequiel Martínez Estrada (1895–1964)
Carlos Mastronardi (1901–1976)
Hugo Midón (1944–2011)
Emilio F. Mignone (1922–1998)
Bartolomé Mitre (1821–1906)
Fray Mocho (José Seferino Álvarez) (1858–1903)
Graciela Montes (born 1947)
Manuel Mujica Láinez (1910–1984)
H. A. Murena (1923–1975)

N
Andrés Neuman (born 1977)
José Narosky (born 1930)

O
Rafael Obligado (1851–1920)
Luis Moreno Ocampo (born 1952)
Silvina Ocampo (1903–1993)
Victoria Ocampo (1890–1979)
Héctor Germán Oesterheld (born 1919; disappeared and presumed dead 1977)
Sergio Olguín (born 1967)
Andrés Oppenheimer (born 1951)
Olga Orozco (1920–1999)
Elvira Orphée (1922-2018)
Juan L. Ortiz (1896–1978)

P
Adrián Paenza (born 1949)
Alicia Partnoy (born 1955)
Josefina Passadori (1900-1987)
Roberto Payró (1867-1928)
José María Paz (1791-1854)
Luisa Peluffo (born 1941)
Néstor Perlongher (1949–1992)
Ricardo Piglia (1941-2017)
Felipe Pigna (born 1959)
Claudia Piñeiro (born 1960) 
Alejandra Pizarnik (1936-1972)
Antonio Porchia (1885–1968)
Juan Carlos Portantiero (1934-2007)
Abel Posse (born 1934)
Manuel Puig (1932-1990)
Adriana Puiggrós (born 1941)

R
Rodolfo Rabanal (1940–2020)
María Cristina Ramos (born 1952)
Patricia Ratto (born 1962)
Silvina Reinaudi (born 1942)
Andrés Rivera (1928-2016)
Jorge B. Rivera (1935–2004)
Mario Rodríguez Cobos (1938–2010)
Arturo Andrés Roig (1922–2012)
Ricardo Rojas (1882–1957)
Viviana Rivero (born 1966)

S
Ernesto Sábato (1911-2011)
Carlos Alberto Sacheri (1933-1974)
:es:Eduardo Sacheri (born 1967)
Juan José Saer (1937-2005)
Beatriz Sarlo (born 1942)
Domingo Faustino Sarmiento (1811-1888)
Juan José Sebreli (born 1930)
Ana María Shua (born 1951)
Silo (pen name of Mario Rodríguez Cobos) (1938-2010)
Osvaldo Soriano (1943-1997)
Alicia Steimberg (1933-2012)
Alfonsina Storni (1892-1938)
Víctor Sueiro (1943-2007)

T 
 Jacobo Timerman (1923-1999)
 Héctor Tizón (1929-2012)
 Raymunda Torres y Quiroga (?-?), 19th-century Argentine writer and women's rights activist

U
Paco Urondo (1930–1976)

V
Luisa Valenzuela (born 1938)
Horacio Verbitsky (born 1942)
Eliseo Verón (1935–2014)
David Viñas (1927–2011)

W
María Elena Walsh (1930–2011)
Rodolfo Walsh (1927–1977)
Juan Rodolfo Wilcock (1919–1978)

Z 
 Raúl Zaffaroni (born 1940)

See also 
 List of Argentine women writers
 Argentine literature
 List of Argentines
 List of Latin American writers

References

External links 
Argentine Contemporary Literature (in Spanish)

Argentine
 List
Writers